The 1755 earthquake may refer to

1755 Lisbon earthquake (great, tsunami), off the coast of Portugal on November 1
or to a style of architecture following this event, Earthquake Baroque
1755 Cape Ann earthquake (tsunami), near the British Province of Massachusetts Bay (present-day Massachusetts, USA) on November 18
1755 Meknes earthquake (great, local), affecting Morocco, dated November 18–19 or November 27 by various sources

See also
List of historical earthquakes